Lenny Jones (born August 8, 1991) is an American football defensive end who is a free agent. He played college football at Nevada and was signed by the San Francisco 49ers as an undrafted free agent in 2016.

Professional career

San Francisco 49ers and Oakland Raiders
On May 6, 2016, Jones was signed by the San Francisco 49ers as an undrafted free agent. He was waived by the 49ers on August 4, 2016 was claimed off waivers by the Oakland Raiders the next day. On August 29, 2016, he was released by the Raiders.

Los Angeles Rams
On November 18, 2016, Jones was signed to the Los Angeles Rams' practice squad.

Dallas Cowboys
On January 10, 2017, Jones was signed to the Cowboys' practice squad. He signed a reserve/future contract with the Cowboys on January 16, 2017. He was waived on September 2, 2017.

Cleveland Browns
On May 6, 2018, Jones signed with the Cleveland Browns. He was waived/injured on August 31, 2018 and was placed on injured reserve. Jones was waived with an injury settlement by the Browns on May 2, 2019.

Calgary Stampeders
Jones signed with the Calgary Stampeders on February 6, 2020. He was released on June 16, 2021.

References

External links
Nevada Wolfpack biography

1991 births
Living people
American football linebackers
Cleveland Browns players
Dallas Cowboys players
Los Angeles Rams players
Nevada Wolf Pack football players
Oakland Raiders players
People from San Leandro, California
Players of American football from California
San Francisco 49ers players
Sportspeople from Alameda County, California
Calgary Stampeders players